Underwood is an unincorporated community within the Columbia River Gorge National Scenic Area along the Columbia River in Skamania County, Washington, United States.

History
The community's moniker comes from Amos Underwood, a pioneer settler. Amos and his brother, Edward Underwood, settled at the mouth of the White Salmon River in 1865.

A post office called Underwood has been in operation since 1900.

Geography
Underwood is located along Washington State Route 14 at the confluence of the White Salmon and Columbia Rivers. The community lies at the southeastern corner of Skamania County.

See also

 List of unincorporated communities in Washington

References

External links

Unincorporated communities in Skamania County, Washington
Unincorporated communities in Washington (state)